Roberto Nani (born December 14, 1988 in Sondalo, Italy) is an Italian former alpine skier. He competed for Italy at the 2014 Winter Olympics in the alpine skiing events.

Season standings

Standings through 28 January 2018

References

External links
 

1988 births
Living people
Olympic alpine skiers of Italy
Alpine skiers at the 2014 Winter Olympics
Italian male alpine skiers
People from Sondalo
Sportspeople from the Province of Sondrio